Manuel Alejandro Ruiz (born May 17, 1978) is a multi-platinum and award winning music and filmmaker and  producer  known by his stage name Boy Wonder. Wonder is also the CEO the record label Chosen Few Emerald Entertainment, Inc. and has been recognized as one of the pioneering entertainment figures to elevate Reggaeton, and push the genre to the forefront of the music industry. Over the years, he has worked with stars like J Balvin, Farruko, Daddy Yankee, Wisin, Yandel, Pitbull and new school Latin urban artist’s Jon Z and Darkiel.

Early life
Born to a Dominican father and Puerto Rican mother in Brooklyn, New York and raised in Long Island City, Queens.  Wonder credits his family with supplying many of his musical influences, including his mother who introduced him to legends like Michael Jackson and The Beatles and an uncle who reintroduced him to various Latin music artists over the years. During high school, his immersed himself in hip hop culture and followed rappers like Nas, The Notorious BIG, Mobb Deep, Wu-Tang, Fat Joe and Big Pun. Following a 1999 trip to Dominican Republic, Wonder seized an opportunity to bring all his musical influences together to cultivate a new sound  that would influence an entire generation of reggaeton artists and the urban Latin music genre as a whole.

Production company

Boy Wonder began the multifaceted record label and multimedia and talent management company, Chosen Few Emerald Entertainment Inc. (CFEE) company in 1999. CFEE represented artists, producers and DJ’s and released numerous documentary films. His next venture would lead to his first foray into filmmaking, partnering with Urban Box Office (UBO) to make a compilation of reggaeton tracks with a complementary documentary showcasing behind the scenes footage of the albums artists and some of reggaeton’s biggest stars. The concept was a major success for Wonder and catapulted him into a new level of fame and recognition in the industry.

Chosen Few compilations, documentaries, and independent productions
With the release of several successful documentaries and compilation albums, Boy Wonder was able to bring his brand of reggaeton/urban Latin music flavor to remote corners of the US and spread the riddim that would become synonymous with the genre for several decades to come. 

•	2003: Chosen Few: El Documental, an award-winning, multi-platinum compilation album and documentary featuring many high profile Reggaeton artists including Zion Y Lennox, Daddy Yankee, Tego Calderon, Don Omar, Voltio and N.O.R.E. The album includes 25 exclusive tracks including the wildly successful Don Omar single, “Reggaeton Latino” remix featuring Fat Joe, N.O.R.E, and LDA. The song spent 44 weeks at the top of the Billboard charts and has been documented as the 2nd biggest crossover track in history, 2nd only to Daddy Yankee’s “Gasolina”.The CD/DVD went on to win the 2004 Latin Billboard Award for Best Latin Compilation of the Year and went multi-platinum. “Reggaeton Latino” remix spent 44 weeks on the Billboard charts. 

•	2005: Wonder released another compilation album with Chencho from the group Plan B, entitled El Draft. Set against the backdrop of a competition to find the next big reggaeton star, El Draft debuted at #4 Billboard’s Latin music charts and became one of the first Reggaeton albums to go platinum. The album launched the careers of Rakim y Ken-Y (winners of the competition) and Jowell y Randy and the artist Fuego. 

•	2006: A second documentary, Chosen Few II: El Documental, captured the rise of reggaeton’s next wave of up-and-coming talent with behind the scenes footage of the Chosen Few tour and exclusive tracks featuring artists like Fat Joe, N.O.R.E, Juelz Santana, Trina, Trick Daddy and Pitbull. The album went double platinum and spent months in the Top 5 of Billboard’s Latin sales chart.

•	2007: Wonder worked with Grammy-award winning artist Alejandro Sanz on the remix of “A la Primera Persona,” featuring Reychesta.The track was released on Sanz’s Special Edition of “El Tren de los Momentos.”

•	2008:  The third documentary, Chosen Few III: The Movie was released. This film included never-before seen depictions of the converging worlds of hip-hop and Latin urban music and features artists like LDA, Fuego, Getto Music and Reychesta “Secret Weapon” along with appearances by  Rick Ross, Jowell y Randy, Fat Joe, Tempo, Barrington Levy, Hector El Father, Cassidy, Twista, Joel Ortiz, Lumidee, Toby Love, Plan B, Nejo from Nejo y Dalmata, Jim Jones, Trick Daddy, Trina and more. It also included the track “Hustlin Time,” featuring Hip-hop sensation Rick Ross. 

Wonder co-produced his then artist, Fuego who scored a smash hit "Mi Alma Se Muere", which was the lead single from the album. The remix of "Mi Alma Se Muere" featuring Pitbull and
Omega "El Fuerte" was released later that year, and the remix peaked at No. 22 with over 24 weeks on the Top 100 Billboards Tropical. 

•	2010: Boy Wonder executive produced Fuego's debut album “La Musica Del Futuro”. The album included "Super Estrella" featuring Omega and "Que Buena Tu Ta" featuring Deevani, which combines Indian rhythms and Latin Mambo beats and peaked at No.2 on the Top 100 Billboard Tropical charts for 12 weeks.  

•	2012: "Chosen Few Urbano - "El Journey" is a documentary project with accompanying soundtrack that explores the United States and international Urbano movement. "Chosen Few Urbano" features Urbano artists from around the world including Fuego, Omega "El Fuerte", Cosculluela, Chino & Nacho, J Balvin, Flex, Jowell y Randy, Dyland y Lenny, Alex Kayza, De La Ghetto, Arcangel, Farruko, La Gente de Zona, NY Mets baseball player Jose Reyes, Villanosam, Fito Blanko, Black Point, and Sensato del Patio.

Upcoming projects
As CFEE looks toward the future, a few upcoming projects are primed to showcase the label’s evolution, bringing in more diversity, conscious lyrics and eclectic vibes. 

Darkiel is a dynamic performer that caught the attention of Boy Wonder and was signed to CFEE in 2019. After gaining notoriety for his performance in “Nicky Jam: El Ganadaor” Darkiel is poised to be one of the breakout starts in this new crop of CFEE talent. His recent single “Cuanto Vale” has amassed more than 12 million views on YouTube and in April 2021 he released a new single “Me Matas”. 

Jon Z: Signed in 2015, Jon-Z is one of CFEE most exciting young performers. Hard-working and committed to evolving his craft, Jon- Z will release a new album in Summer 2021 that will feature his eclectic visual and musical style and trap-inspired music. His newest album "Perdona La Espera" is a catchy blend of rhythms featuring Farruko, Natti Natasha and several other up and coming artists. 

Chosen Few: Fe: Is the new installment of the Chosen Few series aims to tell a more conscience story of today’s reggaeton scene. Wonder describes the concept behind the new project as motivational, spiritual, and tapping into something more positive against the backdrop of a changed world. In a recent interview Wonder reflected on the project by saying “You get a little older, a little wiser and you see how the world changes and you want to do something a little different. I am fortunate enough to have the artists and the relationships to support me.”

Awards and recognition
 Won the 2004 Latin Billboard Award for Best Latin Compilation of the Year
 Multi-platinum certified by the RIAA
 Chosen Few II: El Documental : Double platinum  & Top 5 of Billboard charts Latin sales chart

Additional Nominations Include: 

 Chosen Few El Documental (CD/DVD) Nominated for the Lo Nuestro Award for Urban Album of the Year
 El Draft nominated Latin Billboard Award for Best Latin Compilation of the Year
 Chosen Few Emerald Entertainment, Inc. was nominated for a Latin Billboard Music Award for Best Latin Albums Rhythm Label of the Year
 In 2011, Fuego was nominated for the Premio Lo Nuestro in the category Revelación del Año Urbano

Chosen Few discography
 2004: NYC SEX
 2004: Pocos Elegidos
 2004: Chosen Few I: El Documental
 2005: El Draft 2005
 2006: Chosen Few II: El Documental
 2007: Chosen Few: Remix Classicos
 2008: Chosen Few III: The Movie
 2009: LDA "Revolucionando El Genero"
 2010: Fuego "La Musica Del Futuro"
 2012: Chosen Few Urbano: "El Journey"
 2013: Chosen Few Urbano: "Continues"
 2015: La Música Del Futuro
 2015: The Game Is About To Change
 2015: El Beginning
 2017: JonTrapVolta
 2017: Persiguiendo Un Sueño
 2018: Super Slayan Flow
 2019: Darkiel Edition: El Más Que Escribe
 2019: Voodo
 2020: Perdona La Espera

References

External links
 

1978 births
Living people
People from Long Island City, Queens
Record producers from New York (state)
American chief executives